NRJ (NRJ is an acronym read as Nouvelle Radio Jeune, or énergie in French, pronounced , literally "energy") is a private French radio station created by Jean-Paul Baudecroux and Max Guazzini in June 1981, and was widely popularized thanks to its godmother singer Dalida, who prevented it from closing in 1984. Today radio belongs to the NRJ Group and is the founding station of NRJ International.

The main station only focuses on current chart hits throughout the day and electronic dance music during some weekend late night hours. Talk programs are based every evening except Saturday. In contrast, its web radios are devoted to a vast range of music: rap, RnB, dance, hip-hop, electronic, top 40, urban and rock.

History
In June 1981 Jean-Paul Baudecroux created a music radio station for young people, and founded NRJ (standing for Nouvelle Radio des Jeunes). He then established studios in a tiny room in the 20th arrondissement of Paris in a place of high altitude to strategically cover all Paris on 92.0 MHz. The station was under repeated threat to be shut down by the authorities, with the active intervention of the singer Dalida and her connections was this prevented.

The station has since 1988 expanded internationally, and has started broadcasting in a number of countries:
Russia: In June, 2006, Prof Media, a leading Russian media group, was granted permission to operate the NRJ brand in Russia. NRJ Russia is primarily intended to target an audience between 18 and 35 years old.
Lebanon: On 6 June 2006, NRJ launched its programme on two frequencies in Lebanon. This station is run in English and broadcasts concerts and interviews with international artists from NRJ France.
Canada: In July 2009, Astral Media re-branded its Énergie network of stations in Quebec under the NRJ name as part of a licensing agreement with NRJ. Following their acquisition by Bell Media, the license expired, and the stations returned to the previous Énergie brand.
Finland: In 1995, NRJ started operating in Finland.

Logos

Name of the station
NRJ was originally the acronym for  Nouvelle Radio Jeune  (New Youth Radio) or Nouvelle radio pour les jeunes (New Radio for the Youth), and was not invented to be an allograph of "energy". In the non-French countries where the station also operates, the radio station is simply called Energy, because NRJ can be pronounced phonetically in French as Energy or NRG.

Statistics from Mediametrie (September 2017)
The bold numbers/figures are at number 1.

Weekdays

Weekends

NRJ Presenters
 Manu Levy (Manu dans le 6/10 from 6AM to 10AM on weekdays)
 Sébastien Cauet (C'Cauet sur NRJ from 4PM to 8PM on weekdays)

NRJ Extravadance
This is the name of France's no.1 dance and hip-hop mixed show, airing every weekend at late night slot.

NRJ didn't contain any programs dedicated to this until 1990, when a program called 'Megamix' was launched, presented by Dimitri or Bibi every Sunday nights from 8.00pm to 9.00pm.

The program stayed until 1992, when, for the first time, the 'Extravadance' name was used. It ran on Saturday nights from 10.00pm to 12.00am by Mike. The 'Megamix' block was not axed, but moved to 12.00am to 1.00am each Sunday (right after the new 'Extravadance'). Bibi no longer stayed in this block.

In 1993, 'Extravadance' block was expanded, now starting at 8.00pm. The new presenter for this was Cocto.

In 1994, 'Megamix' was axed, and 'Extravadance' aired every Saturday nights from 10.00pm to 1.00am. It was completely automated.

In 1995, 'Extravadance' stayed at the same timeslot, but now airing weeknights. It was anchored by Cyril Monnier.

In 1996, the show returned the 1994 format.

In 1997, it was expanded, now Saturday nights from 10.00pm to 3.00am. The only presenter was Bibi.

In 1998, 'Extravadance' updated slot to: Saturday nights from 8.00pm to 11.00pm and Friday nights from 10.00pm to 2.00am. Both editions were presented by Vincent Richard.

In 1999, both editions were expanded, now Fridays from 10.00pm to 3.00am and Saturdays from 9.00pm to 12.00am.

In 3/2000, there was, after ten years, no music mixed programming appeared on the schedule.

In 2003, this type of program was revived, but went by the name Mastermix. It broadcast every Saturday at the same timeslot as 'Extravadance' before being axed. 3 DJs featured including Vincent Richard, DJ Mouss et DJ K. From this year, NRJ no longer contains an overnight announcer.

In 2004, DJ Maze and Morgan took control of the show, which now kicked off from 10.00pm.

In 2005, 'Mastermix' was widely expanded on Saturdays, now 8.00pm-2.00am. DJs were also added, including DJ Abdel, Loo and Placido, Morgan Nagoya, DJ Kost, Alberkam, and Matt was the main presenter.

In 2007, 'Mastermix' was pushed up to an hour early (with the same duration): 7.00pm-1.00am. There was also an hour dedicated to the show's replay at 3.00am.

In 2008, the show was significantly pared down, at this time only Sunday mornings from 12.00am to 2.00am. Almost all the DJs were dropped, except Morgan Nagoya.

In 2009, it was expanded to Saturdays 10.00pm-2.00am. Morgan Nagoya was no longer the standalone DJ, but Junior Caldera or Dim Chris also mixed the music for an hour from midnight.

In 2010, 'Mastermix' was added an extra Saturday morning edition from 12.00am to 2.00am, and presented by Big Ali. Saturday night edition saw the addition of many DJs in the same timeslot, like Tiesto, Martin Solveig, Dim Chris, Bob Sinclar, Junior Caldera, Laurent Wolf. There was, for the first time after 18 years, its preceding program also dedicated to the music mix, called 'Royal Mix' and ran from 8.00pm to 10.00pm, with DJ Assad, DJ Milouz, and Leo Lanvin.

In 2011, 'Mastermix' was extended, now airing three times weekly. Friday night/Saturday morning edition now ran from 12.00am to 6.00am and presented by Big Ali till 2.00am, then DJ DMB. Saturday night edition ran from 8.00pm to 6.00am, excluding 2.00am-4.00am (featuring Better days with Bibi). The early slot from 4-6 was also presented by DJ DMB. There was also a Monday overnight edition from 12.00am to 2.00am and mixed by Remady, Junior Caldera, Dim Chris, Junior Caldera.

In 2012, the show had many changes including: Laidback Luke was given his own slot from 2-3 each Saturday morning; Leo Lanvin left 'Royal Mix'; The team took control from 9-12 Saturday nights was Tiesto, Global Deejays, Afrojack, Avicii; and Monday team consisted of DJ Oriska, Kore, Sarahina, DJ Abdel, Claude Njoya.

In 2013, after ten years in use, the name 'Mastermix' was dropped (but now being used in Germany). It now went by the name 'NRJ Extravadance'.

Currently, it broadcasts on weekdays 12:00am-6.00am, Saturdays 8.00pm-6.00am, and Sundays 12.00am-2.00am. Below is the lineup as of December 2021.

Programming
NRJ broadcasts a non-stop program known as "Top 40" or "CHR", centered around the hits of the moment, as demonstrated by its slogan "Hit music only!" and it runs "more than 40 minutes of hits in a row every hour". The concept "10 hits in a row" is again on air since January 9, 2017, on NRJ which characterizes the hit format of the radio, with the current motto "They are 10, they are fresh, they never stop". (French: "Ils sont 10, ils sont frais, ils ne s'arrêtent jamais".) From 2018, NRJ starts carrying "12" or "13 hits in a row".

Slogans
Since the creation of NRJ, several slogans were used:

1981: NRJ je vous remercie, qui de droit !
1981: NRJ va, tout va !
1981: La radio stéréotonique
1981: Le plaisir avant tout
1981 - 1991: La plus belle radio
1991 - 1992: La musique est une force
1997 - 2014: Hit Music Only ! (Que du hit sur NRJ !)
2014 - Now: Hit Music Only ! (Que des hits sur NRJ !)
2016 - Now: Hit Music Only ! (Pop RnB Dance, Ici c'est NRJ !)

Webradios
NRJ had the first web radio in 2006. Later on, there were three (included NRJ's main live stream). In the third quarter of 2006, NRJ added two, and two more at the end of that year. In 12/2013, the station operates about 153 web radios. Here are the list and complete detail of them. (Although NRJ is French, most of web radios' names are in English.) Some of these web radios can also be seen elsewhere worldwide.

NRJ had/has web radios for almost every major artist, every music genres, and every background, but mostly focus on women. They also have adverts like the main station, but no announcers heard on the air at all.

This list below is refreshed almost monthly.

NRJ Hits
This type of stations dedicated to general hits, or NRJ-produced events. Their color is red.

NRJ Dance Electro
This type of web radios offer songs in electronic music. The color is purple.
 NRJ Dance
 NRJ Extravadance (rebroadcast of the mix that DJs performed during NRJ Extravadance)
 NRJ EDM
 NRJ Clubbin'
 NRJ Deep House
 NRJ Dance 90
 NRJ Club Hits
 NRJ Hits Remix
 NRJ Techno Story
 NRJ Remember That?

NRJ Classic
This type of web radios only focuses on a specific classic-related type of music. The color is yellow-brown.

Pop Rock
This type of web radios broadcasts heavy music. The color is dark brown.
 NRJ Pop
 NRJ Rock
 NRJ Classic Rock
 NRJ Metal

Sunrise
This type of web radios provides light music for you as you're waking up in the morning. The color is light yellow.

Sports
These web radios adopt a motivated (mainly electro and hip-hop) playlist dedicated to sports activities. The color is green.
 NRJ Pour le Sport
 NRJ Fitness
 NRJ Hits for Running
 NRJ The Mud Day

NRJ Playlists
This type of web radios focus on the soundtrack on a day's moment or a particular emotion. The color is black.

NRJ Podcasts
This type of web radios rebroadcasts certain programs on NRJ. The color is red.
 NRJ MiKL
 NRJ Manu Le 6/9
 NRJ YouTube
 NRJ Le Rico Show

NRJ Stars
This type of web radios focus on all the songs of a particular artist. The color is blue.

Former web radios

See also
 Chérie FM
 Nostalgie
 Rire & Chansons

External links

References

Radio stations in France
Radio stations established in 1981